Haven is the soundtrack album from the 2004 film Haven, starring Orlando Bloom and Zoe Saldana.

Track listing

Disc one
 Move! - Damian "Jr Gong" Marley
 Melancholy Mood - Ziggy Marley
 "Clouds" - Neuromance
 "Just Be" - Collen & Webb
 "Safe in Mind" (please Get This Gun From Out My Face) - U.N.K.L.E
 "Heaven" - Lamb
 "Here Comes the Night" - Native
 "Latenightman" - Snypah (aka) Junior Ricketts
 "Uuuh" - KansasCali
 "Non Stop Traffic" - FOUR
 "Gotta Change My Life" - Davon from Fragment Crew
 "Blessed Are the Souls" - Heitor Pereira

Disc two
 "We're Safe"
 "The Feds Arrive"
 "You've Got a Fax"
 "We're All Dogs"
 "Blessed Are the Souls"
 "Raped Her?"
 "Carl Talks to Pipa"
 "The Roundabout"
 "Lover's Night"
 "The Red Room"
 "Just Memories"
 "Police Station"
 "Poor Sufferer"
 "Fritz Nightmare"
 "The Way Home"
 "Feds Arrive" (version 1)
 "Love on the Beach" (version 1)
 "Busted"
 "Innocence Lost" (version 1)
 "Let's Roll" (version 1)
 "A Good Team"
 "The Morning After" (version 1)
 "The Hiding Place"
 "Shy's Daydream" (version 1)
 "Schoolyard Fight" (version 1)
 "Lover's Night" (version 1)
 "Haven's Theme" (version 1)

References                 

Film soundtracks
2006 soundtrack albums